Matthew C. Temple (Matthew Temple) is an American filmmaker, writer and creative coach who made nine feature films, directed eight documentaries, written two books and hosts the podcast Tapping Creativity.  While still in college in Vermont, he produced his first film, Senses of Place, which went on to win a Silver Remi award from World Fest Houston, a best of the fest nod at Lake Placid Film Festival, a nomination for Best Independent Film at the Ohio Independent Film Festival, and later picked up for distribution by FilmBuff.

Career

Filmmaker 
In 2001, Temple wrote and produced his first feature film, Senses of Place, while still an undergraduate at Marlboro College. Shot on super 16mm film, the film went on to play at over a dozen film festivals nationwide and won a Remi Award at WorldFest Houston and honored as Best of the Fest at the Lake Placid Film Forum. Since then, Temple has gone on to produce, write and/or direct dozens of projects, including national commercials, music videos, award winning short films and numerous feature films.

In 2007, Temple began working with producers Bill Borden and Barry Rosenbush, producers of High School Musical. He was part of the musical team and music supervisor on two feature films with them, The American Mall, an MTV co-production and First Love: It’s the Music, a Columbia Pictures local language production in Russia, which he also associate produced. Temple served as VP of Production and Development for Mili Pictures, in Santa Monica, CA. He has since produced several independent feature films, including the award-winning independent thriller, The Advocate, directed by Tamas Harangi, the genre thriller Caged with Edi Gathegi, Melora Hardin and Angela Sarafyan and directed by Aaron Fjellman.

Actor 
Shortly after his return to Los Angeles, Temple was cast in his first feature film Animals with Naveen Andrews, Marc Blucas and Nicki Aycox. But it wasn’t until two years later that Temple’s career as an actor began to take off. He started off 2010 being cast in Jonah Hex with Josh Brolin and went on to star in Chillerama with Joel David Moore and Kane Hodder, "L.A. Paranormal", 8213: Gacy House, an Assylum Picture,  and Crescendo by Alonso Alvarez Barredo, whose first short film “Historia de un Letrero” won the highly coveted Best Short Film Award in the Short Film Corner at the 2008 Cannes Film Festival. Temple has starred in over a dozen movies and TV shows.

Personal life 
Temple was born in Los Angeles, CA, where he lived until the age of nine, when his father was offered a job in Denver, CO. That move was the beginning of something of a nomadic life for Temple, who four years later moved on to San Cristobal, Chiapas, Mexico, then Cullowhee, NC, Santa Rosa, CA, and Goettingen, Germany all before graduating from Summerfield Waldorf School in 1995.

After high school, Temple spent the following spring and summer hitchhiking all over Europe, including parts of eastern and southern Europe before postponing college indefinitely while, at the age of 19, preparing for the arrival of his first daughter.

Temple received his Bachelor of Arts degree from Marlboro College where he worked with professor and filmmaker Jay Craven, a relationship that moved him toward filmmaking. In 2006, Temple returned to Los Angeles.

In 2018, Temple got rid of almost everything he owned, packed a suitcase and a backpack and moved to Kenya  with his fiancee. After 12 years in Los Angeles, I was heading out on a new adventure.

Moving to the exact opposite side of the world was a choice very much in line with the path he laid out for himself at an early age. He knew that he needed to forge his own path on his life’s journey of creativity.

The genesis of this traces all the way back to when he was seventeen years old. Winter break of his senior year in high school, he was hitch-hiking through Mexico with a friend, thinking about his future – would he take a “responsible” path in life, with a clear career direction, or commit to a creative life. He made a decision that would change his life forever. He chose the latter.

He formed an a cappella group, Voicewell, and toured Europe. A couple years later, while a full-time college student and waiting tables and night, he made his first movie, “Senses of Place.” That movie went on to win awards on the film festival circuit and was eventually distributed by FilmBuff.

He went on to make nine feature films and work with actors Carrie-Anne Moss, Zac Efron, Edi Gathegi, Melora Hardin and many more. He worked with Academy Award winner Francis Ford Coppola and Oscar-nominated director Mike Johnson; producers Bill Borden and Barry Rosenbush. He co-executive produced a series on Breaker.io.

In 2019 Vertical Entertainment released his documentary feature film, “Hardball: The Girls of Summer.” In January, 2021, Shout! Factory released the thriller, “Caged“, starring Edi Gathegi and Angela Sarafyan, which he produced.

Additionally, Temple is the founder of the non-profit organization NetworkM, now called WeStrive.org

Filmography

Filmmaker

Actor

References 
 Avoiding Post Production Catastrophe
 Senses of Place Interview

External links 
 
 Official Website
 Matthew Temple on Facebook

American filmmakers
American male actors
Marlboro College alumni
Living people
Year of birth missing (living people)